Television House is the former name of a building on Kingsway in London. From 1918, it was the base of the Air Ministry, and later from 1955, was the headquarters of Associated-Rediffusion/Rediffusion London, Independent Television News (ITN), TV Times magazine, the Independent Television Companies Association and, at first, Associated Television. Later, It was the initial base for its successor, Thames Television. After Thames moved out, it was the headquarters of the General Register Office and subsequently of ExxonMobil. It is now known as 61 Aldwych.

History

Adastral House
The Kingsway area had been redeveloped at the start of the 20th century from slums and tenement housing into a broad avenue with grand office buildings and expensive townhouses.

After the formation of the Air Ministry in 1918, its headquarters was on Kingsway; one of two identical buildings opposite Bush House became Adastral House, the name being derived from the RAF motto. This remained the home of the Air Ministry through World War II, and the roof of the building in 1940 during The Blitz is where, while fire-watching, Arthur Harris, made the remark about the bombing to a companion, "Well, they are sowing the wind...". The building became known to the public after the war as it was announced during BBC weather forecasts that the Met Office had measured the temperatures and wind speeds in central London from its roof.

Television House
In 1954, the Independent Television Authority (ITA) awarded the first two contracts for the imminent ITV commercial television network. Because the BBC had previously held a monopoly on broadcasting, there were no non-BBC television studio facilities in the UK. Associated-Rediffusion, as one of the two contractors, needed to build from scratch a whole new facility. The company had hired Thomas Brownrigg as General Manager, partially due to his extensive knowledge of planning and project management, which would be needed in simultaneously building a new company and its studios and headquarters.

British Electric Traction, the majority owner of Associated-Rediffusion, bought the freehold on Adastral House from the government. Brownrigg engaged Bovis Limited (later Bovis Construction) to gut the building internally and build a new suite of offices, technical facilities, and studios to be called Television House. This was begun in early 1955 and, with a planned start date for ITV of 22 September 1955, was worked on at great speed, virtually 24 hours a day.

Four small studios (numbered 7, 8, 9, and 10) were built inside the building, mainly for current affairs and continuity use (the main large studios, later the Fountain Studios, were based at the former 20th Century Fox studios in Wembley in Middlesex). Additionally, office space and dining facilities for over 1,000 people were created. A suite of management offices, replete with an oak-paneled boardroom, was built.

The original headquarters and studio facilities of ITN were located on the seventh and eighth floors of the building.

TV Times, part-owned by Associated-Rediffusion, occupied offices in the building from 1957 until April 1958.

A computer room, housing an early mainframe computer that controlled advertising bookings, was added on the second floor in 1966.

Associated TeleVision (ATV) inhabited Television House for the first few years of broadcasting, mainly as office accommodation rather than studio facilities. For a period early in ITV's history, Associated-Rediffusion provided this space for free as part of the effort to keep ITV afloat during the financial crisis of 1955-1957.

St Catherine's House
In the 1967 ITV contract round the ITA awarded the London weekday contract to a joint company formed from ABC Weekend TV and Rediffusion Television, Thames Television. This new company had a surplus number of studios in London. The Wembley studios were therefore sold to the then-new London Weekend Television. Thames, controlled by the former ABC, decided that a brand new studio complex, equipped from the start for colour broadcasting and located out of the center of London would be more appropriate.

Thames used Television House as its headquarters whilst the building of the new Thames Television House in Euston took place.

When Television House was vacated in the early 1970s, it was again occupied by the government, this time by the General Register Office, where it housed the birth, marriage and death certificates of the English and Welsh populations. The building was renamed St Catherine's House.

In the 1990s, the building was vacated by the General Register Office, which by then had become the Office of Population Censuses and Surveys, which moved to Southport in Merseyside, and, after extensive refurbishment, it became the UK headquarters of ExxonMobil.

Centrium
After ExxonMobil left, the building was renamed "The Centrium" and housed several corporations, including Herman Miller, the Nursing and Midwifery Council, SVG Capital, Takeda Pharmaceuticals, Ashmore Group, Tishman Speyer and Interconnector UK

61 Aldwych
Later, the building was renamed "61 Aldwych" by the manager Tishman Speyer. Tenants still include the Nursing and Midwifery Council and Herman Miller

Production space
 Studio 7: . 33' by 24' = 10 m x 7.3 m
 Studio 8: . 38' by 25' = 11.6 m x 7.6 m
 Studio 9: . 64' by 40' = 19.5 m x 12.2 m
 Studio 10: . 26' by 12' = 8 m x 3.7 m
 Master Control: .
 Maintenance Workshop: .
 VTR (with 2x Ampex video recorders): .
 Telecine (with 2x Cintel, 1x RCA Vidicon and 2x EMI Flying Spot telecine machines): .
 Rehearsal rooms x6: .
 Projector theatres x 6
 Cutting rooms x15
 Dubbing theatre

References
 Croston, Eric ITV 1963 London: Independent Television Authority 1963
 Various authors A Guide to Rediffusion Television Studios London: Rediffusion Television Ltd April 1967
 Elliott, Ronald (Ed.) Fusion: Associated-Rediffusion's House Magazine number 19, June 1961
 Graham, Russ J London Calling undated, accessed 21 February 2006
 Centrium, accessed 7 February 2008

External links
 Television House by Telemusications from Transdiffusion
 British Film Institute's screenonline.org

Buildings and structures in the City of Westminster
Cultural and educational buildings in London
ITV offices, studios and buildings
Mass media company headquarters in the United Kingdom
Media and communications in the City of Westminster
History of the Royal Air Force